This is a list of NCAA Division I women's basketball tournament bids by school, at the conclusion of the 2022 conference tournaments. Schools whose names are italicized are no longer in Division I and can no longer be included in the tournament. The 2020 NCAA Division I women's basketball tournament was never played due to the COVID-19 pandemic.

There are a total of 68 bids possible (32 automatic qualifiers, 36 at-large) since the 2022 NCAA Division I women's basketball tournament.

Vacated appearances are not included in the totals.

The table is current through the 2023 NCAA Division I women's basketball tournament.

Bids
(#) – Vacated appearance

Notes

Schools vacating NCAA tournament appearances
Two schools have vacated NCAA Tournament appearances in women's basketball.

Schools yet to receive bids

Notes

See also
NCAA Division I men's basketball tournament bids by school
NCAA Division I men's basketball tournament bids by school and conference

References

College women's basketball records and statistics in the United States
College basketball in the United States lists
NCAA Division I lists